Bryomorphe is a monotypic genus of flowering plants in the family Asteraceae, containing the single species Bryomorphe aretioides. It is endemic to South Africa, where it grows in sandstone fynbos in the Western Cape.

This is a compact, tufted plant that superficially resembles a patch of moss. It forms a mound just a few centimeters tall. The branches are covered in small, linear leaves. The flower heads each contain 6 or 7 white ray florets and 7 to 9 red disc florets. The fruit has a plumelike white pappus.

The species grows in exposed, rocky habitat, anchoring in thin soil accumulated in rock crevices. It tolerates cold temperatures, dry conditions, wind, and snow.

The plant is widespread in its range and not declining.

Another species name, Bryomorphe lycopodioides, is a synonym for Dolichothrix ericoides.

References

Gnaphalieae
Monotypic Asteraceae genera
Endemic flora of South Africa